The Centre pour l'Édition Électronique Ouverte (Cléo), based in Marseille, France, is overseen by Aix-Marseille University, the Centre National de la Recherche Scientifique, School for Advanced Studies in the Social Sciences, and University of Avignon and the Vaucluse. It produces the open access academic publishing portal , which includes platforms Calenda, Hypotheses, and OpenEdition Journals. OpenEdition focuses on publications in the academic fields of humanities and social sciences. The centre also issues a blog about open access.

OpenEdition Journals 

The following list includes some examples of titles in Journals.openedition.org (prior to December 2017 known as Revues.org:

A

 Afriques: Débats, Méthodes et Terrains d'Histoire
 Agone
 Ambiances
 Amnis: Revue d'études des sociétés et cultures contemporaines Europe-Amérique
 Annales de Bretagne et des pays de l'Ouest
 Annales historiques de la Révolution française
 Annuaire de l'École pratique des hautes études, section des sciences religieuses
 Annuaire de l'École pratique des hautes études. Section des sciences historiques et philologiques
 Annuaire du Collège de France
 Anthropology of food
 Apparence(s)
 Articulo – Journal of Urban Research
 L'Atelier du Centre des recherches historiques

B

 Balkanologie
 
 Bulletin de méthodologie sociologique
 Bulletin du Centre de recherche français de Jérusalem

C

 Cahiers d'Études africaines
 
 
 
 
 China Perspectives (Perspectives chinoises)
 
 Clio. Femmes, genre, histoire
 Commonwealth Essays and Studies
 Cultures et Conflits
 Current Psychology Letters
 

D

 Développement durable et territoires
 Diacronie
 Discours

E

 Économie publique
 Éducation relative à l'environnement
 Encyclopédie berbère
 Enquête
 
 
Études arméniennes contemporaines (2013–)
 Études de communication
 European Journal of American Studies

F

 Field Actions Science Reports
 Finance-contrôle-stratégie

G

 Genre & Histoire
 Géomorphologie: Relief, Processus, Environnement
 Gradhiva

H

 Histoire de l'éducation
 L'Homme

I

 Insaniyat / إنسانيات (Centre de recherche en anthropologie sociale et culturelle, Algeria)

J

 Journal de la Société des Américanistes
 Journal de la Société des océanistes
 

L

 Lexis – Journal in English Lexicology

M

 Médiévales
 
 Methodos
 Métropoles

N

 Noesis
 
 Nuevo Mundo, Mundos Nuevos

O

 Oliviana

P

 Paléo
 Physio-Géo
 Pratiques|Pratiques
 Le Portique

Q

 Quaderni
 Quaternaire
 Questions de communication

R

 Recherches sociologiques et anthropologiques
 Revue française des sciences de l’information et de la communication
 
 Revue d'histoire du XIXe siècle
 Revue de l'histoire des religions
 
 La Revue pour l'histoire du CNRS
 Rives méditerranéennes
 

S

 S.A.P.I.E.N.S
 Semen
 Sillages critiques
 Sociétés et jeunesses en difficulté
 SociologieS
 Strates

T

 Techniques & Culture
 Terrain
 : Revue d’études américaines (American Studies Journal) 

V

  (Montreal)
 Volume!

See also
 OpenEdition access via Wikipedia Library
 Open access journal
 Open access in France
 List of academic databases and search engines

References

This article incorporates information from the French Wikipedia.

Bibliography

External links
 Centre pour l'édition électronique ouverte official site
 OpenEdition.org official site
 Books.openedition.org (OpenEdition Books) official site
 Journals.openedition.org (OpenEdition Journals) official site

Aix-Marseille University
French National Centre for Scientific Research
Open access (publishing)